Tassili Airlines is an Algerian passenger airline, based in Algiers, owned by Sonatrach, the national state-owned oil company of Algeria.

Founded in 1998, Tassili now provides scheduled services out of Houari Boumedienne Airport, as well as its charter flights and helicopter services, that were originally mainly for the Algerian oil industry.

History
Tassili Airlines was originally established in 1998 as a joint venture between Air Algérie (49%) and the Sonatrach company (51%), both of which are government-owned. Commercial services were launched on 8 April 1999, with a flight from Hassi Messaoud to Algiers.

In April 2005, Air Algérie withdrew its funds in the airline, which thus became wholly owned by Sonatrach.

Tassili Airlines became a member of AFRAA in 2014, since when it has continued its expansion of regional and international routes.

Corporate affairs

Ownership
The airline is state-owned, being 100% owned by Sonatrach, the national state-owned oil company of Algeria.

Business trends
The annual accounts of the state-owned Tassili Airlines do not seem to have been published. A few recently available figures (largely from AFRAA reports) are shown below (for years ending 31 December):

Destinations
As of December 2015, Tassili Airlines offers scheduled flights to the following destinations:

Algeria
Adrar - Touat-Cheikh Sidi Mohamed Belkebir Airport
Algiers - Houari Boumedienne Airport (base)
Annaba - Rabah Bitat Airport
Batna - Mostépha Ben Boulaid Airport
Béchar - Boudghene Ben Ali Lotfi Airport
Constantine - Mohamed Boudiaf International Airport
Djanet - Djanet Inedbirene Airport
Ghardaïa - Noumérat - Moufdi Zakaria Airport
Hassi Messaoud - Oued Irara Airport
Illizi - Takhamalt Airport
Oran - Ahmed Ben Bella Airport
Setif - Ain Arnat Airport
Tamanrasset - Tamanrasset Airport
Tlemcen - Zenata – Messali El Hadj Airport
Tindouf - Tindouf Airport
France
Marseille
Nantes
Paris - Charles de Gaulle Airport
Strasbourg
Turkey
Istanbul - Istanbul Airport (Charter)

Fleet

The Tassili Airlines fleet consists of the following aircraft (as of August 2019):

The airline also owns several types of smaller aircraft, including Beechcraft 1900, Cessna 208 Caravan and Pilatus PC-6, as well as Bell 206 helicopters.

Accidents and incidents
On 28 January 2004, at around 21:00 local time, a Tassili Airlines Beechcraft 1900 (registered 7T-VIN) crashed 10 kilometres short of Ghardaïa Airport where it had been scheduled to land completing a chartered flight from Hassi R'Mel Airport. The pilot Mebarki Mohamed had to abort the landing approach because a preceding aircraft had not cleared the runway in time. During maneuvering for reaching the approach path again, the aircraft hit the ground with its right wing, which was subsequently torn off. Of the two passengers and three crew members on board, all but the co-pilot survived the crash.
On 10 August 2017, a Tassili Airlines Bell 206 was destroyed by impact and post-impact fire when it crashed on an empty lot at Dekakna, about 5 km southwest of Douera, Algeria. All four on board are believed to have died in the accident. The accident happened in daylight (1020L) and apparently in VMC. According to press reports the helicopter was being used to film the new railway line between Zeralda and Algiers.

See also

List of airlines of Algeria
Transport in Algeria

References

External links

Official website 
Official website (Archive)

1998 establishments in Algeria
Government-owned airlines
Government-owned companies of Algeria
Airlines of Algeria
Airlines established in 1998
Companies of Algeria
Companies based in Algiers
Algerian brands